Adelbert J. McCormick (December 16, 1845 – December 27, 1903) was an American merchant and politician from New York.

Life 
McCormick was born on December 16, 1845 in Ridgeway, New York, the son of Nelson McCormick. He attended Medina Academy.

McCormick attended the University of Rochester, graduating from there in 1869. He was a member of Psi Upsilon. He then worked as principal of a Fayetteville school from 1869 to 1872. He then returned to Ridgeway, where he was a dealer in Medina sandstone. He served as town supervisor for four terms.

In 1891, McCormick was elected to the New York State Assembly as a Republican, representing Orleans County. He served in the Assembly in 1892 and 1893.

In 1869, McCormick married Ella S. Abbot. They had three children, Charles Nelson, Elva L., and Carl L.

McCormick died at home on December 27, 1903. He was buried in Boxwood Cemetery.

References

External links 
The Political Graveyard
Adelbert J. McCormick at Find a Grave

1845 births
1903 deaths
People from Ridgeway, New York
University of Rochester alumni
Town supervisors in New York (state)
19th-century American politicians
Republican Party members of the New York State Assembly
Burials in New York (state)